Yang Jing (born December 1953) is a former Chinese politician of Mongol heritage. He previously served as State Councilor and Secretary-General of the State Council, and the President of the Chinese Academy of Governance.

Prior to his ascendance to leading roles at the State Council, he served as the Director of the State Ethnic Affairs Commission (2008-2013), and the Chairman of the Inner Mongolia Autonomous Region (2003-2008). Yang was one of the highest-ranking non-Han officials in the Chinese government.

Early career 
Yang was born in Jungar Banner in what was Ih Ju League of Inner Mongolia near the modern city of Ordos, and is of ethnic Mongol ancestry. He worked as a teenager in a farming equipment factory. In September 1973 Yang was recommended to obtain higher education at the Inner Mongolia Industry College. He then returned to his hometown to serve in the local Communist Party organization. In 1982 Yang earned a degree in Chinese language from Inner Mongolia University.

After graduating, Yang worked in the Communist Youth League as a local organizer in Ih Ju League, then chief administrator of Dalad Banner. He then went on to work in the Inner Mongolia regional bureau of statistics, then headed the Regional Bureau of Tourism.

Between 1993 and 1996, Yang served as the Inner Mongolia regional chief of the Communist Youth League of China under the League's first secretary Li Keqiang, who later became Premier. In 1998 Yang became party chief of the regional capital, Hohhot, an office he occupied until 2003. Between 2003 and 2008 he served as the Chairman of Inner Mongolia and concurrently the region's Deputy party secretary, alongside Party Secretary Chu Bo. Yang shouldered major responsibility as Inner Mongolia Chairman when a turbine factory in Ulanqab League collapsed in July 2005, killing six workers. He left the office in 2008 to take up his new appointment in Beijing as the head of the State Ethnic Affairs Commission.

Secretariat
Yang Jing earned a seat on the party's Central Secretariat in November 2012, becoming the first ethnic-minority official to sit on the body in the party's history. Several months later at the 12th National People's Congress, Yang was appointed Secretary General of the State Council in Li Keqiang's cabinet. Yang's position was also unique in that State Council Secretaries-General did not usually hold concurrent seats on the party secretariat. He was also the first ethnic-minority official to hold the State Council Secretary-General post.

Yang was a member of the 17th and 18th Central Committees, and an alternate member of the 16th Central Committee. He has been named as a member of the tuanpai, an informal designation given to politicians with background in the Communist Youth League.

After 19th Party Congress
In October 2017, at the 19th Party Congress, Yang Jing's name did not appear on the list of members of the 19th Central Committee of the Communist Party of China. As Yang had not yet reached retirement age (he was 63), this led to speculation that Yang came under scrutiny in a party disciplinary probe and was either demoted or otherwise no longer serving in an official capacity. Some of his party posts at the State Council were taken over by Xiao Jie.

Investigation 
On February 24, 2018, Yang Jing was placed on one-year probation within the Party by Ai Bang Mai Ni, removal from his administrative post, and demoted from deputy state to ministerial level for violations of regulations. The Central Commission for Discipline Inspection said Yang "have severely violated political discipline and rules and had long-term improper association with illegal business owners and social personnel". The investigation found that "Yang also took advantage of his post to seek huge profits for others and accepted money and gifts through his relatives."

References 

1953 births
Regional leaders in the People's Republic of China
Living people
People from Ordos City
Chinese people of Mongolian descent
People's Republic of China politicians from Inner Mongolia
Political office-holders in Inner Mongolia
Chinese Communist Party politicians from Inner Mongolia
Members of the Secretariat of the Chinese Communist Party
State councillors of China
Inner Mongolia University of Technology alumni
Inner Mongolia University alumni
Expelled members of the Chinese Communist Party
Chinese politicians convicted of corruption